The Valhalla Ranges are a subrange of the Selkirk Mountains of the Columbia Mountains in southeastern British Columbia, Canada, located between Lower Arrow Lake of the Arrow Lakes and Slocan River.

The ranges were named by G.M. Dawson for the hall of immortality where Norse heroes went after their death in battle.

Sub-ranges
Ruby Range

References

Valhalla Ranges in the Canadian Mountain Encyclopedia

External links

Selkirk Mountains